Jussi Markkanen (born May 8, 1975) is a Finnish professional ice hockey executive and former goaltender. He is currently serving as general manager of SaiPa. Markkanen played extensively in various European professional leagues as well as the National Hockey League (NHL). He was selected in the fifth round of the 2001 NHL Entry Draft, 133rd overall, by the Edmonton Oilers, as an over-aged entrant.

Playing career
Markkanen played most of his NHL career in Edmonton, except for a single season stint with the New York Rangers. During the 2004–05 NHL lockout, Markkanen played in the Russian Super League, where he posted a dominant 31–9–9 record. In July 2007, Jokerit agreed to a one-year contract with Markkanen for the next SM-liiga season.

After an injury to Oilers starter Dwayne Roloson, Markkanen was selected by coach Craig MacTavish to finish the 2006 Stanley Cup finals as Edmonton's number one goaltender. Markkanen won the first Stanley Cup game of his career in Game 3 of the Finals against the Carolina Hurricanes on June 10, 2006, a game in which he earned the first star of the game. In Game 5 of the final, Markkanen and the Oilers beat Carolina 4–3 in overtime thanks to Fernando Pisani's short-handed breakaway goal. In Game 6, Markkanen stopped all 16 Hurricane shots for his first career playoff shutout. Carolina won the deciding Game 7, as Markkanen gave up two goals and the Hurricanes later secured the win with an empty net goal, defeating Edmonton 3–1 to win the Stanley Cup.

Post NHL

After the great season in Edmonton, Markkanen did not regain the same form in the following season and after the 2006–07 NHL season, Markkanen was out of contract.

Markkanen was contracted by Finnish top-runners Jokerit, who replaced Scott Langkow with Markkanen. Markkanen's move was a bit controversial because he owns a part of SaiPa, which also plays in the Finnish SM-liiga with Jokerit.

Markkanen played well in the 2007-08 regular season, placing himself among the top goaltenders in the league. Markkanen however sustained a heavy injury during his first playoff game and missed the remainder of the playoffs.

After the end of the season, it was announced that Markkanen would return to the Russian Super League, where he played during the 2004–05 lockout-season for Lada Togliatti. Markkanen's new club was the famous Russian side CSKA Moscow, where he made 25 appearances during the 2008-09 campaign. He left on April 7, 2009 and signed with EV Zug of the Swiss Nationalliga A. His first Zug stint ended at the conclusion of the 2012–13 season, when he opted to return to his native Finland.

From 2013 to February 2017, he played for SaiPa of the Finnish Liiga. In the 2013–14 season, he was presented with the Urpo Ylönen Trophy as the Liiga Goaltender of the Year. When his former club EV Zug came calling in February 2017, he signed with the Swiss team for the remainder of the 2016–17 season.

Personal

He is married to his wife, Sanna. Their family suffered a tragedy on September 23, 2008 in Moscow, as one of their two sons, Olli-Matias, died after falling out of a fifth-story window while playing in the living room with his older brother, Juho. He was 4 years of age.

Career statistics

Regular season and playoffs

International

Awards and honours

References

External links
 
 Jussi Markanen's player page - at EV Zug (in German)

1975 births
People from Imatra
Edmonton Oilers draft picks
Edmonton Oilers players
Finnish expatriate ice hockey players in Russia
Finnish ice hockey goaltenders
HC CSKA Moscow players
HC Lada Togliatti players
Ice hockey players at the 2002 Winter Olympics
Imatran Ketterä players
Jokerit players
Living people
New York Rangers players
Olympic ice hockey players of Finland
Tappara players
SaiPa players
Sportspeople from South Karelia